Elizabeth Stone (born as Ketevan Khurtsidze) is an American Paralympic swimmer of Georgian origin.

Biography
Elizabeth Stone was adopted on the 4th of July at age 4 from Kutaisi, Georgia. In the last year of high school she used to compete in track & field and also sometimes run a  race for River Bank Run in Grand Rapids, Michigan. She participated in the 2004 Summer Paralympics in Athens, Greece. At the 2006 World Championships she won a gold medal for 4x100 metre medley and a bronze one for the  backstroke. In 2008 Paralympics she won a silver medal for another 100 metre backstroke in Beijing, China and on 2010 World Championships she won another gold for 4x100 metre medley which was held at Eindhoven, Netherlands. Couple of years later she received a bronze medal for her participation at 2012 Summer Paralympics in London.

References

https://twitter.com/EKA_Stone
https://www.facebook.com/lizkastone

American people of Georgian (country) descent
Sportspeople from Kutaisi
Paralympic swimmers of the United States
Paralympic bronze medalists for the United States
Paralympic silver medalists for the United States
Swimmers at the 2004 Summer Paralympics
Swimmers at the 2008 Summer Paralympics
Swimmers at the 2012 Summer Paralympics
American female backstroke swimmers
American female medley swimmers
Living people
Year of birth missing (living people)
Medalists at the 2008 Summer Paralympics
Medalists at the 2012 Summer Paralympics
American sportswomen
S9-classified Paralympic swimmers
Paralympic medalists in swimming
American adoptees
21st-century American women